The Lycian sarcophagus of Sidon is a sarcophagus discovered in the Ayaa necropolis, in Sidon, Lebanon. It is made of Parian marble, and resembles the shapes of ogival Lycian tombs, hence its name. It is now located in the Istanbul Archaeological Museum. It is dated to circa 430-420 BC. This sarcophagus, as well as others in the Sidon necropolis, belonged to a succession of kings who ruled in the area of Phoenicia between the mid-5th century BC to the end of the 4th century BC.

The sarcophagus was decorated in Greek sculptural style by Greek artists from Ionia, but incorporating the general shape of the ogival tombs from Lycia, such as the Tomb of Payava. This is sometimes presented as an example of Greco-Persian art, although this should be qualified more precisely as Greco-Anatolian art, since such examples are unknown in the wider Achaemenid Empire.

The sarcophagus is decorated with reliefs, the side reliefs illustrating a lion-hunt and a boar-hunt, while the reliefs at the end show fighting centaurs and sphinxes.

The Lycian sarcophagus of Sidon, is, together with the famous Alexander Sarcophagus, one of four massive carved sarcophagi, forming two pairs, that were discovered during the excavations of the Ayaa Necropolis conducted by Osman Hamdi Bey, an Ottoman of Greek descent and Yervant Voskan, an Ottoman of Armenian descent, at the necropolis near Sidon, Lebanon in 1887.

See also
 Tabnit sarcophagus
 Alexander Sarcophagus

References

Phoenician sarcophagi
Archaeology of the Achaemenid Empire
Sidon District
1887 in the Ottoman Empire
1887 archaeological discoveries